Omer Poos (August 22, 1902 – August 11, 1976) was a United States district judge of the United States District Court for the Southern District of Illinois.

Education and career

Born in Mount Olive, Illinois, Poos received a Bachelor of Laws from Saint Louis University School of Law in 1924. He was in private practice in Mount Olive from 1924 to 1939, and then in Hillsboro, Illinois until 1958.

Federal judicial service

On August 16, 1958, Poos was nominated by President Dwight D. Eisenhower to a seat on the United States District Court for the Southern District of Illinois vacated by Judge Charles Guy Briggle. Poos was confirmed by the United States Senate on August 19, 1958, and received his commission on August 21, 1958. He served as Chief Judge from 1966 to 1972, assuming senior status on August 31, 1973. Poos served in that capacity until his death on August 11, 1976.

References

Sources

External links
 Historical Society of Montgomery County Illinois

1902 births
1976 deaths
Judges of the United States District Court for the Southern District of Illinois
United States district court judges appointed by Dwight D. Eisenhower
20th-century American judges
Saint Louis University School of Law alumni
People from Mount Olive, Illinois
People from Hillsboro, Illinois